Anton Švajlen (born 3 December 1937 in Solčany, Czechoslovakia) is a former Slovak football goalkeeper who played for Topoľčany, Trenčín, Prievidza, Brezno and mostly for VSS Košice (1959–1975). He competed for Czechoslovakia at the 1964 Summer Olympics in Tokyo where he won a silver medal in the team competition. Švajlen played five matches for the Czechoslovakia Olympic Team (one at the 1964 Olympics) and three matches for the Czechoslovakia national football B team, but he never played for the first team.

During his 14 seasons at the Czechoslovak First League he made 336 appearances (214 without substitution). Švajlen was also known as penalty taker. He scored 11 goals during his career.

References

External links
 

1937 births
Living people
Czechoslovak footballers
Slovak footballers
Olympic footballers of Czechoslovakia
Olympic silver medalists for Czechoslovakia
Olympic medalists in football
Footballers at the 1964 Summer Olympics
Medalists at the 1964 Summer Olympics
People from Topoľčany District
Sportspeople from the Nitra Region
FC VSS Košice players
Association football goalkeepers